Liao Yongyuan (born 1962) is a former Chinese business executive. He was the president of China National Petroleum Corporation (CNPC), which is the oil giant of China. Liao is also nicknamed "Northwest Tiger". On March 15, 2015, Liao Yongyuan was placed under investigation by the Communist Party's anti-corruption agency.

Career
Liao Yongyuan was born in Songzi, Hubei in 1962. He graduated from Jianghan Petroleum University (now Yangtze University) and China University of Petroleum. In 1999, Liao became the general manager of Tarim Oilfield. He became the assistant to the general manager of the CNPC in 2004 and he became the Vice-President of CNPC in 2007. In 2013, Liao Yongyuan became the president of CNPC.

On March 15, 2015, Liao Yongyuan was placed under investigation by the Central Commission for Discipline Inspection of the Chinese Communist Party for "serious violations of laws and regulations". He was expelled from the Communist Party on June 15, 2015. On January 19, 2017, he was sentenced to 15 years, and fined 1.5 million yuan.

References

1962 births
Living people
People from Jingzhou
Businesspeople from Hubei
Expelled members of the Chinese Communist Party
Chinese white-collar criminals